"St. Agnes" is a poem by Alfred Tennyson, first published in 1837, revised in 1842, and retitled "St. Agnes' Eve" in 1857.

History 
The poem was first published in 1837 in The Keepsake, an annual edited by Lady Emmeline Stuart Wortley, and was included in Poems (1842). No alteration was made in it after 1842.

In 1857 the title was altered from "St. Agnes" to "St. Agnes' Eve", thus bringing it near to Keats' poem, The Eve of St. Agnes, which certainly influenced Tennyson in writing it, as a comparison of the opening of the two poems will show. 

Agnes of Rome, the saint from whom the poem takes its name, was a young girl of thirteen who suffered martyrdom in the reign of Diocletian: she is a companion to Sir Galahad.

Text

Notes

References

Bibliography 

 Collins, John Churton, ed. (1900). The Early Poems of Alfred, Lord Tennyson. London: Methuen & Co. pp. 238–241. 
 McLuhan, H. M., ed. "St. Agnes' Eve". RPO: Representative Poetry Online. University of Toronto Libraries. Retrieved 12 May 2022.
 Ringel, Meredith (21 December 2004). "The Theme of "The Eve of St. Agnes" in the Pre-Raphaelite Movement". The Victorian Web. Retrieved 12 May 2022.
 Tennyson, Hallam (1897). Alfred Lord Tennyson: A Memoir by his Son. Vol. 1. London: Macmillan and Co., Limited. pp. 142, 157, 420.

Poetry by Alfred, Lord Tennyson
1837 poems